Ira Saul Glasser (born April 18, 1938) served as the fifth executive director of the American Civil Liberties Union (ACLU) from 1978 to 2001. His life was the subject of the 2020 documentary Mighty Ira.

Early years 
Ira Glasser was born on April 18, 1938, at Brooklyn Jewish Hospital in Brooklyn, New York. He earned a graduate degree in mathematics from Ohio State University.

Early career 
In the early 1960s, Glasser taught mathematics at Queens College (CUNY) and Sarah Lawrence College. From 1963 to 1967, he was the editor of Current magazine. In 1967, Glasser joined the New York Civil Liberties Union as associate director. In 1970 he became the NYCLU's executive director, in which capacity he served until he became the executive director of the American Civil Liberties Union in 1978.

Executive director 
The ACLU website credits Glasser with transforming the American Civil Liberties Union "from a 'mom and pop'-style operation concentrated mainly in a few large cities to a nationwide civil liberties powerhouse." At the end of Glasser's directorship the ACLU maintained staffed offices in all fifty states, the District of Columbia, and Puerto Rico; when he became director in 1978, only about half of the states had staffed offices. Glasser raised the ACLU's annual income from $4 million in 1978 to $45 million in 1999.

Although the ACLU had protected civil liberties generally through litigation, Glasser expanded the focus of the ACLU's activities through lobbying and public education programs.

Glasser retired in 2001; he was succeeded as executive director of the ACLU by Anthony D. Romero.

In his retired life, Glasser serves as the president of the board of directors of the Drug Policy Alliance.

Publications 
 Doing Good: The Limits of Benevolence (co-author, 1978)
 Visions of Liberty: The Bill of Rights for All Americans (1991)
 BUSTED: The Citizen's Guide to Surviving Police Encounters (narrator) – Produced by Flex Your Rights

Notes

References 
 Center for Cognitive Liberty and Ethics Biography
 National Review, April 7, 1994
 ACLU Press-Release on Glasser's Retirement
 Transcript of Ira Glasser's 1988 pre-election speech defending the ACLU

External links 
 

1938 births
Living people
20th-century American Jews
Jewish activists
American Civil Liberties Union people
People from Brooklyn
Ohio State University Graduate School alumni
Queens College, City University of New York faculty
Sarah Lawrence College faculty
Activists from New York (state)
21st-century American Jews